Khatta Meetha is a Hindi/Urdu phrase which means "sweet and sour". It may refer to:
 Khatta Meetha (1978 film), a Bollywood film directed by Basu Chatterjee, starring Ashok Kumar and Rakesh Roshan in the lead roles
 Khatta Meetha (2010 film), a Bollywood film directed by Priyadarshan, starring Akshay Kumar and Trisha Krishnan in the lead roles